Lesozavodskoy is a rural locality (a settlement) in Zaigrayevsky District, Republic of Buryatia, Russia. The population was 781 as of 2010. There are 9 streets.

Geography 
Lesozavodskoy is located 55 km southeast of Zaigrayevo (the district's administrative centre) by road. Dede-Tala is the nearest rural locality.

References 

Rural localities in Zaigrayevsky District